The Chief Minister of Madhesh is the head of government of Madhesh Province. The Chief Minister is appointed by the governor of according to Article 167   of the constitution of Nepal. The chief minister is the head of the council ministers of province and the chief adviser to the governor of Madhesh Province. Madhesh Province was formed after the adoption of the constitution of Nepal. On 17 January 2022, the meeting of provincial assembly  declared Janakpur as Capital of Province no. 2 while the Province was rename to Madhesh Province.

The current chief minister is Saroj Kumar Yadav from 11 January 2023.

See also
President of Nepal
Prime Minister of Nepal
List of chief ministers of Madhesh Province
Chief Minister of Bagmati Province
Chief Minister of Sudurpashchim Province
Chief Minister of Gandaki Province
Chief Minister of Lumbini Province
Chief Minister of Karnali Province

References

Madhesh Province